Nils Olav Nilsen (24 January 1942 – 11 October 2021) was a Norwegian footballer who played as a striker in his early career, but was later used as a midfielder. He scored 19 goals in 62 matches for the Norway national team.

On club level Nilsen played for Viking, being team captain during their heyday in the early 1970s. With Nilsen a commanding figure, they won three league championships in 1972, 1973 and 1974. The supporters nicknamed him "Olav Viking".

References

External links
Career stats

1942 births
2021 deaths
Norwegian footballers
Association football forwards
Association football midfielders
Norway international footballers
Viking FK players
Norwegian football managers
Viking FK managers
Sportspeople from Stavanger